North Bay station is an inter-city bus station located in the city of North Bay, Ontario, Canada. The station is located east of downtown near the Trans-Canada Highway (Ontario Highways 11 & 17) and directly southeast of the Northgate Shopping Centre. It was designed and laid out as an intermodal station, serving both passenger trains and intercity buses; however, due to the suspension of the Ontario Northland Railway's Northlander and Dream Catcher Express rail services in 2012, it is currently active only as a bus terminal.

Station amenities include an indoor waiting area, lockers, parcel shipping and receiving, ticket vending, and Wi-Fi. The outdoor bus platform features a covered waiting area and seating. As well, the Northgate Shopping Centre is situated across the railway tracks from the station and is accessible via a pedestrian tunnel.

Services

Current

Former

The station was once a major component of the Ontario Northland Railway, being served by the Northlander and Dream Catcher Express intercity passenger trains. Both services were cancelled in 2012 and it is currently inactive as a passenger railway station.

Connections

The most direct local transit connections are North Bay Transit's 5 Graniteville and 7 Birchhaven/Trout Lake bus routes. Additionally, North Bay Transit's 2 Marshall Park and 3 Ski Club/Pinewood bus routes serve the nearby Northgate Shopping Centre, which can be reached via an underground pedestrian tunnel from the station.

The local transit hub in North Bay is the downtown Peter Reid Bus Terminal, which is located 3km west of the station. It is ironically aligned with a different rail corridor: the CPR line leading to Sudbury. It is, however, connected to the intercity station via bus.

See also
 North Bay/Jack Garland Airport -

References

External links
ONTC Terminal - North Bay Station

Bus stations in Ontario
Ontario Northland Railway stations
Rail transport in North Bay, Ontario
Railway stations in Nipissing District
Transport infrastructure completed in 1996
Railway stations in Canada opened in 1996
1996 establishments in Ontario
Railway stations closed in 2012